Selonian was an Eastern Baltic language, which was spoken by the Eastern Baltic tribe of the Selonians, who until the 15th century lived in Selonia, a territory in southeastern Latvia and northeastern Lithuania.

History

During the 13th–15th centuries, the Selonians lost their language after being assimilated by the Lithuanians.

Traces of the Selonian language can still be found in the territories the Selonians inhabited, especially in the accent and phonetics of the so-called Selonian dialect of the Latvian language. There are some traces of the Selonian language in the northeastern sub-dialects of the Aukštaitian dialect of the Lithuanian language, mostly in the lexicon.

Classification
It is considered that the Selonian language retained the Proto-Baltic phonemes *an, *en, *in, *un like the Lithuanian language, but like the Latvian language the Proto-Baltic ,  changed to c, dz, and the Proto-Baltic *š, *ž changed to s, z.

References

East Baltic languages
Medieval languages
Extinct Baltic languages
Extinct languages of Europe
Languages of Lithuania
Languages of Latvia